Night Alarm is a 1934 American drama film directed by Spencer Gordon Bennet and starring Bruce Cabot as a down on his luck reporter, Hal Ashby, who tries to make a name for himself by investigating a series of bizarre arson attacks. The film, which was a hit in movie theatres at the time, is now widely available in the public domain.

Plot summary 
A reporter itching to get off the boring gardening "beat" gets a chance to investigate a series of arson fires that have been plaguing the city. He believes the fires are tied into a web of political corruption involving a wealthy businessman, the mayor and the police chief. Complications ensue when the girl assigned to help him turns out to be the businessman's daughter.

Cast 
Bruce Cabot as Hal Ashby
Judith Allen as Helen Smith, posing as Mrs. Van Dusen
H.B. Warner as Henry B. Smith
Sam Hardy as Editor Stephen Caldwell
Harry Holman as Mayor Wilson
John Bleifer as Dr. Alexander Dexter
Tom Hanlon as Vincent Van Dusen
Betty Blythe as Elizabeth Van Dusen
Fuzzy Knight as Dinner Club Comedian

Soundtrack

External links 

1934 films
American black-and-white films
1934 romantic drama films
American romantic drama films
Majestic Pictures films
1930s English-language films
Films directed by Spencer Gordon Bennet
1930s American films